Death from laughter is a supposedly extremely rare form of death, usually resulting from either cardiac arrest or asphyxiation, that has itself been caused by a fit of laughter. Instances of death by laughter have been recorded from the times of ancient Greece to modern times. 

Usually, the phrase "dying from laughter" is used as a hyperbole.

Pathophysiology 
Death may result from several pathologies that deviate from benign laughter. Infarction of the pons and the medulla oblongata in the brain may cause the pseudobulbar affect. Asphyxiation caused by laughter leads the body to shut down from the lack of oxygen.

Laughter can cause atonia and collapse ("agelastic syncope"), which in turn can cause trauma. See also laughter-induced syncope, cataplexy, and Bezold–Jarisch reflex. Gelastic seizures can be due to focal lesions to the hypothalamus. Depending upon the size of the lesion, the emotional lability may be a sign of an acute condition, and not itself the cause of the fatality. Gelastic syncope has also been associated with the cerebellum.

Notable cases 

 Zeuxis, a 5th-century BC Greek painter, is said to have died laughing at the humorous way in which he painted the goddess Aphrodite – after the old woman who commissioned it insisted on modeling for the portrait.
 Chrysippus, also known as "the man who died from laughing at his own joke", is a 3rd-century BC Greek Stoic philosopher who died of laughter after he saw a donkey eating his fermented figs; he told a slave to give the donkey undiluted wine to wash them down, and then, "having laughed too much, he died" (Diogenes Laërtius 7.185).
 In 1410, King Martin of Aragon died from a combination of indigestion and uncontrollable laughter triggered by a joke told by his favourite court jester.
 In 1556, Pietro Aretino "is said to have died of suffocation from laughing too much".
 In 1660, Thomas Urquhart, the Scottish aristocrat, polymath, and first translator of François Rabelais' writings into English, is said to have died laughing upon hearing that Charles II had taken the throne.
 On October 14, 1920, 56-year-old Arthur Cobcroft, a dog trainer from Loftus Street, Leichhardt, Australia, was reading a five-year-old newspaper and was amused at the prices for some commodities in 1915 as compared to 1920. He made a remark to his wife regarding this, and burst into laughter, and in the midst of it he collapsed and died. A doctor named Doctor Nixon was called in, and stated that the death was due to heart failure, brought by excessive laughter.
 During the night of October 30, 1965 in Manila, Philippines, a 24-year-old carpenter who was well-known for making his companions laugh was telling jokes to his friends. The joke, which the carpenter's friends told to the police, was so funny that it caused the carpenter to fall in a uncontrollable fit of laughter, from which he then fainted, was brought to the hospital, but died before he could be given medical help. The book The Big Book of Boy Stuff by author Bart King recounts the incident in anecdotal form, where the carpenter was instead told the joke by his friends rather than himself, and "laughed until he cried, collapsed, and then died."
 On March 24, 1975, Alex Mitchell, from King's Lynn, England, died laughing while watching the "Kung Fu Kapers" episode of The Goodies, featuring a kilt-clad Scotsman with his bagpipes battling a master of the Lancastrian martial art "Eckythump", who was armed with a black pudding. After 25 minutes of continuous laughter, Mitchell then slumped on the sofa and died from heart failure. His widow later sent The Goodies a letter thanking them for making Mitchell's final moments of life so pleasant. Diagnosis of his granddaughter in 2012 of having the inheritable long QT syndrome (a heart rhythm abnormality) suggests that Mitchell may have died of a cardiac arrest caused by the same condition.
 In 1989, during the initial run of the film A Fish Called Wanda, a 56-year-old Danish audiologist named Ole Bentzen reportedly laughed himself to death.

See also 
 Kuru, also known as "laughing sickness"
 Laughing gas
 Laughter-induced syncope
 List of unusual deaths
 Paradoxical laughter
 Sardonicism
 Tickle torture
 "The Funniest Joke in the World", episode of British sketch comedy Monty Python, which revolves around a joke so funny that anybody who hears it promptly laughs themselves to death
 "The Stand In", episode of American comedy Seinfeld, which features Jerry Seinfeld telling a joke to a hospital patient who then suddenly dies from laughter
 Infinite Jest, a novel by David Foster Wallace in which the meta-narrative includes a film so entertaining that those who see it lose all interest in anything else, and die.
The Clean House, a play where dying of laughter is a reoccurring theme.

References

External links 
 "Have People Died Laughing?" Snopes.com. 2004.

Laughter
Laughter